Pagnell may refer to:

Boothby Pagnell, village in the South Kesteven district of Lincolnshire, England
Hooton Pagnell, village in the metropolitan borough of Doncaster in South Yorkshire, England
Newport Pagnell, town in the Borough of Milton Keynes, England
Newport Pagnell Rural District, rural district in Buckinghamshire, England, from 1894 to 1974
Newport Pagnell services, motorway service station between junctions 14 and 15 of the M1 motorway
Newport Pagnell Town F.C., football club based at Newport Pagnell, near Milton Keynes